Reagan Jones (born March 2, 1973 in Lufkin, Texas) is an American singer-songwriter, best known as the lead singer of synthpop band Iris. Jones formed Iris with Matt Morris in 1993, and remained the original vocalist for the band until its disbandment in 2021.

His influences include Depeche Mode, New Order, Idlewild, Imogen Heap, Coldplay, The Killers, Glenn Phillips, Guy Chadwick, and R.E.M., among others. Jones is a practicing Christian and environmentalist.

Discography

Iris
Disconnect (2000)
Awakening (2003)
Wrath (2005)
Hydra (2008)
Blacklight (2010)
Radiant (2014)
Six (2019)

References

External links
 Synth Radio interview with Reagan Jones
 Official Iris website
 Iris on Myspace
 
 
 

Living people
People from Lufkin, Texas
Singer-songwriters from Texas
1973 births
American environmentalists
Activists from Texas
21st-century American singers
21st-century American male singers
American male singer-songwriters